Tala Abujbara (born 22 July 1992) is a Qatari rower. She competed in the women's single sculls event at the 2020 Summer Olympics.

Career
Tala Abujbara learned to row while studying at Williams College, where a coach saw her potential and she joined the team. Upon returning home to Qatar, she had nobody to pair with, so she switched to the single sculls.

In August 2018, she qualified for Repechages as well as ranking sixth in the women’s single sculls of rowing held in Palembang. Abujbara also represented Qatar in the summer 2020 Tokyo Olympics. She qualified for the Tokyo Olympics after reaching a time of 8:20 minutes at the Asia and Oceania Rowing Qualification Championship.

In July 2021, Abujbara took the first place in the semi-final race to qualify for the final of the Women’s Single Scull event at the Tokyo Olympics.

Recognition
On 6 July 2021, the Qatar Olympic Committee (QOC) announced, that Tala Abujbara was appointed as the first Qatari female athlete to represent Qatar in Rowing at the Olympic Games. 

On 22 July 2021, the QOC announced that Tala Abujbara along with Mohammed Al-Rumaihi would raise Qatar’s flag at the opening of the Tokyo Olympics. This was the first Olympics edition where two athletes carried their country’s flag.

References

External links
 

1992 births
Living people
Qatari female rowers
Olympic rowers of Qatar
Rowers at the 2020 Summer Olympics
Place of birth missing (living people)
Williams Ephs athletes
Williams College alumni
College women's rowers in the United States
Rowers at the 2018 Asian Games